Dr. Cireo McAfee McCracken House is a historic home located at Fairview, Buncombe County, North Carolina. It was built in 1924, and is a two-story, frame American Foursquare style dwelling.  It has a low hipped roof and "L"-shaped front and rear porches.  It was the residence of a long-time country doctor, who was in practice for 45 years.

It was listed on the National Register of Historic Places in 1995.

References

Houses on the National Register of Historic Places in North Carolina
Houses completed in 1924
Houses in Buncombe County, North Carolina
National Register of Historic Places in Buncombe County, North Carolina